Thomas Kessler (born 1986), is a German footballer.

Thomas Kessler may also refer to:

Thomas Kessler (composer) (born 1937), Swiss composer
Tommy Kessler, musician